Faal is a surname. The surname is found in Senegal and the Gambia. In English speaking Gambia, it is spelt Faal, and in French speaking Senegal, it is spelt Fall but pronounced the same way throughout the Senegambia region. This surname is also found in Scotland, which is unrelated to the African surname and pronounced differently. In Scotland, the surname means "a rocky place." Notable people with the surname include:

Ayden Faal, English rugby league footballer
Essa M. Faal, Gambian international lawyer
Gibril Faal (born 1967), British-Gambian businessman
Saloum Faal (born 1995), Gambian footballer
Tacko Fall (born 1995), Senegalese  basketball player

See also
Phall
Faal (disambiguation)

References

Gambian surnames
Senegalese surnames
Scottish surnames